Dale Smith (born 1967) is an American poet, editor, and critic. Smith was born and raised in Texas and studied poetry at New College of California in San Francisco. Having completed his PhD at the University of Texas in Austin, he and his wife, the poet Hoa Nguyen, now live in Toronto Ontario, Canada, where he is an assistant professor of English at Toronto Metropolitan University.

While in San Francisco, Smith was co-editor of Mike & Dale's Younger Poets, which put him in contact with many important poets from previous generations as well as the young poets of his own generation. After moving to Austin in 1998, he and Hoa Nguyen started the small press publishing venture Skanky Possum. From November 2003 to October 2004, then from October 2007 to April 2009, Smith wrote a lively column for Bookslut. Smith's poetry and essays have been widely published, including an appearance in The Best American Poetry 2002. In 2007, he wrote the introduction to Ed Dorn's Way More West (2007, Penguin), and more recently he has authored a work of critical scholarship as well as new poetry.

Works
American Rambler (Thorp Springs Press, 2000)
The Flood & The Garden (First Intensity, 2002)
Coo-coo Fourth July (Backwoods Broadsides, 2002)
My Vote Counts (BlazeVOX Books, 2004)
Notes No Answer (Habenicht Press, 2005)
Black Stone (Effing, 2007)
Susquehanna (Punch Press, 2008)
Slow Poetry in America (Cuneiform, 2014)
Poets Beyond the Barricade: Rhetoric, Citizenship, and Dissent after 1960 (University of Alabama Press, 2012)

Resources

External links
Poetry
Nine poems from Black Stone at Liminalities
from Notes No Answer at New American Writing
from Sons at Fascicle
http://liminalities.net/9-4/slowpoetry.pdf
http://www.brooklynrail.org/2014/03/poetry/dale-smith
Prose
Reading Philip Whalen an essay
Philip Whalen: An Introduction another essay on Philip Whalen
Space Suits an essay on Robert Creeley
The Romantic-Modern Lyric essay at Jacket
Edward Dorn's Coups notes on the work of Ed Dorn
http://www.poetryfoundation.org/bio/dale-smith
http://www.thevolta.org/inreview-mainpage.html
Misc
To Be a Good Finder Smith in conversation with Kent Johnson at Jacket
Relational Poetics a dialogue between Smith and Alan Gilbert
Review of Pierre Joris's 4 x 1
http://therumpus.net/2013/01/poets-beyond-the-barricade-by-dale-m-smith/
http://jacket2.org/commentary/poetry-and-enactments-public-space
http://theconversant.org/?p=1731
http://jacketmagazine.com/38/iv-smith-goldsmith.shtml

1967 births
Living people
21st-century American poets
University of Texas at Austin alumni